Brow's Tavern is a historic tavern (now a private residence) at 211 Tremont Street in Taunton, Massachusetts. It was built circa 1780 and enlarged circa 1800. It is reputed to have once been a tavern on the Bristol Path (now known as Tremont Street).

The house was originally a five-bay Cape Cod style house with a narrow doorway with a transom. It was expanded to the west.

It was added to the National Register of Historic Places in 1984. The original doors have since been replaced. Some of the original wood details have also been removed.

See also
National Register of Historic Places listings in Taunton, Massachusetts

References

National Register of Historic Places in Taunton, Massachusetts
Drinking establishments on the National Register of Historic Places in Massachusetts
Buildings and structures in Taunton, Massachusetts
Houses in Bristol County, Massachusetts